Steve Southern (born 29 April 1982) is an Australian former professional rugby league footballer who played as a  and  forward in the 2000s and 2010s.

He previously played for the North Queensland Cowboys and Newcastle Knights in the National Rugby League, and the Wakefield Trinity Wildcats (captain) (Heritage № 1310) in the Super League.

Playing career
Born in Wollongong, New South Wales, Southern played his junior football for Dapto before being signed by the St. George Illawarra Dragons.

In 2004, Southern signed with the North Queensland Cowboys.

In Round 14 of the 2004 NRL season, Southern made his NRL début for the Cowboys against the Newcastle Knights.

In September 2010, after playing over 120 games for the Cowboys, Southern signed a 1-year contract with the Newcastle Knights starting in 2011.

In August 2011, Southern signed a 3-year contract with Super League team, Wakefield Trinity Wildcats, in a deal that would see him captain the club.

In October 2012, Southern decided to cut his stint at Wakefield short, and return to Australia.

Representative career
In 1999 and 2000, Southern played for the New South Wales Schoolboys.

In 2000, Southern played for the Australian Schoolboys.

References

External links
2012 Titan Management profile
2011 Newcastle Knights profile

1982 births
Living people
Australian rugby league players
Australian expatriate sportspeople in England
Central Coast Centurions players
Newcastle Knights players
North Queensland Cowboys players
Rugby league locks
Rugby league players from Wollongong
Rugby league second-rows
Wakefield Trinity captains
Wakefield Trinity players